Melodifestivalen 2019 was the 59th edition of the Swedish music competition Melodifestivalen and was held between 2 February 2019 and 9 March 2019. Presenters were Sarah Dawn Finer, Kodjo Akolor, Marika Carlsson and Eric Saade. Edward af Sillén returned as a consultant and adviser, producing various interval acts for the hosts. The winner of the contest is John Lundvik with the song "Too Late for Love". He represented Sweden in the Eurovision Song Contest 2019 in Tel Aviv, Israel, finishing in 5th place.

Format 
Melodifestivalen 2019, organised by Sveriges Television (SVT), was the eighteenth consecutive edition of the contest in which the competition took place in different cities across Sweden. The four heats were held at the Scandinavium in Gothenburg (2 February), the Malmö Arena in Malmö (9 February), the Tegera Arena in Leksand (16 February) and the Sparbanken Lidköping Arena in Lidköping (23 February). The Second Chance round took place at the Rosvalla Nyköping Eventcenter in Nyköping on 2 March while the final was held at the Friends Arena in Stockholm on 9 March. An initial 28 entries competed in the heats, with seven entries taking part in each show. The top two entries from each heat advanced directly to the final, while the third and fourth placed entries advanced to the Second Chance round. The bottom three entries in each heat were eliminated after two rounds of voting. An additional four entries qualified for the final from the Second Chance round, bringing the total number of competing entries in the final to 12.

Presenters 
In October 2018, Sarah Dawn Finer, Kodjo Akolor, Marika Carlsson and Eric Saade were announced as the presenters for Melodifestivalen.

Voting 
The public vote previously used a simple majority to decide the places, but concerns had been raised over a growing bias through the way votes were cast: that votes cast through the app were giving an unfair weight to younger voters, as older voters tended to cast theirs though the telephone vote. For 2019, SVT changed to a system of eight groups: those using the app voted within one of seven age groups, and telephone votes were in the eighth group.

These groups were weighted equally against each other: for the heats, each group's vote would carry a score of 12, 10, 8, 6, 4, 2, and 1; for the final, 12, 10, 8–1 (thus entries in 11th and 12th receiving no points); for the second chance round, each group gave one point to the most popular entry of each duel. The scores within each round were then added together to decide the places. In the final, to ensure equal weight was given to the public vote and the international jury vote, the number of countries involved was reduced from eleven to eight.

2019's edition also saw an end to voting by SMS, due to a decline in usage.

Competing entries 
The twenty-eight competing entries were announced to the public during a press conference on 27 November 2018.

Heats

Heat 1
The first heat took place on 2 February 2019 at the Scandinavium arena in Gothenburg. A total of 7,158,333 votes were cast throughout the show with a total of 573,040 SEK collected for Radiohjälpen.

Heat 2
The second heat took place on 9 February 2019 at the Malmö Arena in Malmö. A total of 6,993,333 votes were cast throughout the show with a total of 522,183 SEK collected for Radiohjälpen.

Heat 3
The third heat took place on 16 February 2019 at the Tegera Arena in Leksand. A total of 6,305,045 votes were cast throughout the show with a total of 662,869 SEK collected for Radiohjälpen.

Heat 4
The fourth heat took place on 23 February 2019 at the Sparbanken Lidköping Arena in Lidköping. A total of 6,810,817 votes were cast throughout the show with a total of 905,041 SEK collected for Radiohjälpen.

Second Chance Round 
The Second Chance Round took place on 2 March 2019 at the Rosvalla Nyköping Eventcenter in Nyköping. A total of 7,244,085 votes were cast throughout the show with a total of 949,238 SEK collected for Radiohjälpen.

Final 
The Final took place on 9 March 2019 at Friends Arena in Stockholm. A total of 15,757,707 votes were cast throughout the show with a total of 4,273,096 SEK collected for Radiohjälpen.

Gallery

Heat 1

Heat 2

Heat 3

Heat 4

References

External links 
Melodifestivalen Official Site 

2019 song contests
February 2019 events in Sweden
Eurovision Song Contest 2019
March 2019 events in Sweden
2019
2010s in Malmö
2010s in Gothenburg
Events in Gothenburg
Events at Malmö Arena
Events in Leksand
Events in Lidköping
Events in Nyköping
Events in Solna
2019 in Swedish music
2019 Swedish television seasons
2019_Swedish_television_series_debuts
2019_Swedish_television_series_endings